Vârlezi is a commune in Galați County, Western Moldavia, Romania with a population of 2,204 people, mostly Orthodox. It is composed of two villages, Crăiești and Vârlezi.

References 

Communes in Galați County
Localities in Western Moldavia